San Jacinto Mall was a regional shopping mall located in Baytown, Texas, United States. It was last managed by Fidelis Realty Partners. The mall ceased operations on January 4, 2020 and will be redeveloped into an outdoor shopping destination. The first phase is due to open in November 2020. The mall was anchored by Sears, JCPenney, Macy's, Montgomery Ward, Mervyn's, Service Merchandise, Bealls, Palais Royal, and Marshalls.

History
San Jacinto Mall opened its doors in 1981. At the time, the mall was relatively large for the immediate market area but nonetheless successful. In the central area of the mall was a JCPenney and the food court coined "The Market". The other wings each had one anchor and one junior anchor: a northwest wing, originally anchorless until Mervyn's filled the vacant pad in the early 80's, along with a HJ Wilson Catalog Showroom as junior anchor, a southwest wing with Foley's and Palais Royal as junior anchor, a southeast wing with Montgomery Ward and junior anchor Bealls, and a northeast wing bearing a Sears and junior anchor The Fair. Over the years, the mall had trouble competing with the many new, big box stores that had sprung up along Garth Road, south of the mall. Service Merchandise and Montgomery Ward closed in 2001 (both due to a countrywide company liquidation).  Bealls also vacated the same year. These anchors have never been refilled. The next major loss happened in early 2006, when Mervyn's closed all of its stores in the Houston area. In addition to the southeast wing, the northwest wing of the mall was also now anchorless. Soon after, a proposal was rendered by NewQuest Properties to demolish both the southeast wing (former Bealls/Wards) and northwest wing (former Mervyn's/Service Merchendise) and transform them into "lifestyle" additions. Foley's was rebranded as Macy's in September 2006. In November 2006, Triyar Cos. LLC, owned by the Yari family, put the mall and several other Greater Houston malls up for sale; the company allowed a buyer to either buy an individual property, or buy all of them at once. As of January 2014, demolition of the two wings and construction of the "lifestyle" additions had yet to commence and it is unclear whether this proposal is still being considered or if it has been shelved. It was reported on July 16, 2015, that a sale of the mall to Fidelis Realty Partners had been finalized. The mall will be redesigned to an open air complex with the original anchor stores.  The project will take three years to complete. On October 4, 2018, it was announced that Sears would be closing in December 2018 as part of a plan to close 12 stores nationwide which left JCPenney and Macy's as the only anchors left.

The demolition of parts of the mall began on June 28, 2019.

As of October 2019, with only 14 stores remaining in what is left of the mostly demolished mall, property management informed the tenants that the mall will be ceasing all operations at the end of the year.  The mall did finally close after 38 years on January 4, 2020.

On July 31, 2020, JCPenney put 21 stores up for sale, this one included.

On August 13, 2021, it was announced that JCPenney would be closing in Fall 2021.

The mall's final store, Macy's, announced on January 5, 2022 that it would be closing. 

Demolition started in 2019, and was completed in late 2022.

References

External links

 
 Labelscar summary

Baytown, Texas
Shopping malls in Greater Houston
Defunct shopping malls in the United States
Demolished shopping malls in the United States
Greater Houston
Galveston Bay Area
Shopping malls established in 1981
Shopping malls disestablished in 2020